Islas Ildefonso are a group of islands in Chile. The islands belong to the Commune of Cabo de Hornos in Antártica Chilena Province of Magallanes and Antártica Chilena Region.

Description 

The islands were named by the Spanish navigator Diego Ramírez de Arellano, who piloted the Garcia de Nodal expedition through the region in 1619.
The islands consist of nine stacks, within two groups. They extend  on a northwest–southeast axis. The islands are steep and rocky, and covered in tussac grass.

Important Bird Area 

The islands have been identified by BirdLife International as an Important Bird Area because they hold large breeding populations of both southern rockhopper penguins (86,000 breeding pairs) and black-browed albatrosses (47,000 breeding pairs). There are also smaller numbers of grey-headed albatrosses.  Magellanic penguins, imperial shags and sooty shearwaters present.

See also 

 List of islands of Chile
 List of Antarctic and sub-Antarctic islands
 List of Antarctic islands north of 60° S

References 

Archipelagoes of Chile
Islands of Tierra del Fuego
Stacks (geology)
Uninhabited islands of Chile
Important Bird Areas of Chile
Archipelagoes of the Pacific Ocean
Important Bird Areas of subantarctic islands
Seabird colonies
Penguin colonies